USS Nahma may refer to the following ships of the United States Navy:

  was a small ferry/patrol boat that was built in 1902 and served the New Orleans area during World War I.
  was a motor patrol boat used primarily as an escort for British shipping into the Mediterranean during World War I.

United States Navy ship names